is a former professional Japanese baseball player. He is employed as a bullpen catcher for the Chunichi Dragons.

His eyes are of a blue tinge due to American heritage through his grandfather.

References

External links
 Dragons.jp
 NPB.jp

1988 births
Living people
Baseball people from Aichi Prefecture
Japanese baseball players
Nippon Professional Baseball catchers
Chunichi Dragons players